Ally Miller may refer to:

Ally Miller (footballer)
Ally Miller (rugby union)